Thurgoona is an outer suburb of the regional city of Albury in southern New South Wales, Australia. The suburb is located in the City of Albury local government area.

History 

Thurgoona Post Office opened on 1 January 1874, closing in 1961.

The first land release in Thurgoona was St Johns Hill in 1978, followed by St Jones Green in 1980, Corrys Wood in 1981, St Hilaire in 1985 and Thurgoona Park in 1986. The 1980s were a time of massive growth and development in Thurgoona. Thurgoona Drive and Elizabeth Mitchell Drive were completed by 1982, connecting Thurgoona to Albury via the Hume and Riverina Highways. Soon after the Thurgoona Golf Club opened its first 9 holes in 1983, followed by a further 9 holes in 1985. 
In 1986 the Albury-Wodonga Corporation moved its headquarters to Thurgoona. 
By 1989, a hotel had opened at the golf course, a new shopping centre was under construction, Thurgoona Public School opened and the Thurgoona Industrial Park opened near the Albury Airport.

In March 2010 Thurgoona saw the opening of a new Thurgoona Plaza, with Woolworths, a Hume Bank branch and many other new shops. New shops include a tandoori restaurant, hairdressing salon, pizza shop, pharmacy, butcher, bakery, two cafés and a Thai takeaway restaurant.

In late 2015, a local resident took a photograph of a giant goanna scaling the wall of his house. The photograph was featured in national media

Education 
Thurgoona's schools include Thurgoona Public School (est.1862), Border Christian College and Trinity Anglican College.

The NSW TAFE Environmental Centre (NEC) is located in Thurgoona. It is one of TAFE's headquarters for specialist training in Civil Construction, Natural Resource Management, Spatial Information (GIS), Water Operations, Permaculture, Organic Farming, environmentally related studies and sustainable agriculture.

Charles Sturt University purchased land at Thurgoona in 1993 from the Albury-Wodonga Development Corporation to the value of $6 million. Then in April 1997 construction began on the new Thurgoona campus. Originally, it was established as a secondary campus to the Albury campus, however by 2010 that campus closed and the Thurgoona campus had been developed into their sole Albury campus. During late 2010, a new dentistry and oral health campus were completed behind the Thurgoona Plaza.

Sport 
The town has an Australian Rules football team competing in the Tallangatta & District Football League, a league based mainly in Victoria.

Geography 
Thurgoona is located to the east of the Hume Freeway and to the north-east of the Albury CBD.

Thurgoona is known for a relatively large network of Box Gum Grassy Woodlands that used to cover most of the New South Wales Southern Slopes. The nature corridors within Thurgoona maintained and developed by the local community and the former Albury-Wodonga Development Corporation in the 1980s and 1990s, has allowed habitats to sustain local wildlife.

While the area is home to over 100 species of birds, it is also home to many threatened species. These include Sloane’s Froglet, Regent Honeyeater, and the Squirrel Glider (Petaurus norfolcensis). Squirrel Gliders are listed as threatened in NSW and Thurgoona is home to a significant population of the arboreal (tree-dwelling) mammal.

Residents 
At the 2016 Census, the population of Thurgoona was 8,656. The most common religion was Catholic, followed by no religion, and the average weekly household income was $1,618, above the Australian average of $1,438. The median age was 32 below the national average of 38.

References

Suburbs of Albury, New South Wales
1874 establishments in Australia
Hume Highway